Amber J. Lawson (born August 24, 1972) is an American producer, entrepreneur, and online content and development executive. She is best known as the founder and CEO of Comedy Gives Back, a global multi-platform live streamed stand up comedy event and benefit.

Early life 
Lawson was born in Kansas City, Missouri into an Italian family. She went to Raytown South High School and earned a theatrical performance degree from University of Missouri.

Career 

After receiving a Bachelor of Arts in Theatrical Performance from the University of Missouri, Lawson began her acting career at The Second City, a comedy troupe based in Chicago. Lawson's first job as an actress was in a Chicago production of Tony n' Tina's Wedding; she was fired by the show's director, Jay Leggett, who then rehired her to appear in Tony n Tony's Wedding, which Leggett also directed. Shortly thereafter, Lawson moved to Los Angeles, where she briefly pursued her career as an actor, winning a GLAAD Award nomination for her portrayal of Bette Midler in A Gay Christmas Carol.

In 1999, Lawson founded internetworksstudios.com, developing online content. The firm produced Pop Girl, a talent competition. In 2000, internetworksstudios.com was renamed Stage 3 Studios, a media company focused on creating programming for film and television. Under the banner of Stage 3 Studios, Lawson converted Pop Girl into a one-hour dramedy, Alyx, and partnered with Madonna, among others, to sell the script. Additionally, Lawson served as a development consultant, working with Fox Entertainment Group, NBCUniversal, Warner Bros. and others.
In 2006, Lawson and Leggett partnered to create Comedy Cocktail, a live sketch comedy show performed in Los Angeles, which launched the careers of Ask A Ninja and Frangela, among others. Additionally, Comedy Cocktail conceived, developed and produced Super Seniors, an early incarnation of Comedy Central's Workaholics. Also in 2006, they were hired by the National Lampoon to relaunch the National Lampoon Lemmings live tour and cast and create the Lampoon's comedy albums. Based on the Lemmings success, Lawson and Leggett were recruited to serve as senior development executives at the company.

In 2008, Lawson joined the staff of ManiaTV. In 2009, she moved to Babelgum, serving as comedy publisher for the company, a curated free-to-view internet, mobile and fixed television platform. While at Babelgum, Lawson created several viral hit series, including Kids Reenact, In 60 Seconds, and Kevin Pollak's Vamped Out. In 2010, Lawson was recruited by AOL to fill the newly created position of Vice President/Head of Video Programming; additionally, she was appointed Chairman of Interactive Media Peer Membership Working Group for the Academy of Television Arts & Sciences, and IAWTV Awards Chairman by the International Academy of Web Television.

Lawson is a founding partner of StoryTech, a Los Angeles-based brand and technology consultancy developed in partnership with the Opportunity Management Company (TOMC) in 2011. Also in 2011, she founded Comedy Gives Back, formerly known as Transforming the World Through Comedy.  The organization produces their tentpole event, Comedy Gives Back, a global streaming multi-platform 24-hour stand up comedy event benefiting various charities annually. Comedy Gives Back premiered on November 16, 2011, and included performances from Gotham Comedy Club in New York, Zanies Comedy Club in Chicago and The Improv in Los Angeles. Comics involved in Comedy Gives Back include Dane Cook, Kevin Nealon, Adam Carolla, Reggie Watts, Marc Maron, Rove McManus, Greg Behrendt, Russell Peters, Skyler Stone, Adam Devine, Finesse Mitchell, and Garfunkel and Oates. 2013's Comedy Gives Back took place on November 6, to coincide with the New York Comedy Festival, and featured performances from comedians in Sydney, London, New York and Los Angeles. The event benefited Malaria No More. The 2014 event was held on May 9, and was live streamed from the SXSW Festival.  It benefited Feeding America.

Lawson  serves on the boards of OpenSlate Studios, Social Media Week LA, Picture Healing, and Attention Span Media. She has been a featured speaker at NAB, CES, LATV Fest, Montreal Comedy Festival, Digital Hollywood, Comedy Content Summit, SXSW, ITVfest and NATPE, focusing on interactive and immersive content, branded entertainment, multiplatform strategies, monetization, social media, entertainment consumption, and advertising and business strategy in traditional, online and mobile media.  She became a judge for the Adweek Watch Awards in 2014, and was selected to host the first-ever International Digital upfront at MIPTV Media Market in 2014.

References

External links 
Comedy Gives Back
Comedy Gives Back YouTube Channel 
Amber J Lawson on Twitter
Amber J Lawson on Facebook 
StoryCentered

Film producers from California
Living people
Businesspeople from Kansas City, Missouri
Actresses from Los Angeles
University of Missouri alumni
Television producers from California
American women television producers
American women film producers
1972 births
21st-century American women